Aberdeen Railway Co v Blaikie Brothers (1854) 1 Paterson 394 is a UK company law case. It concerns the fiduciary duty of loyalty, and in particular, the duty not to engage in self-dealing. It laid down a basic rule that if a director had an interest in a corporate transaction, the transaction is voidable at the company's will, and it is the duty of directors to avoid any possibility of a conflict of interest.

This case preceded the Companies Act 2006 section 177, that requires that if directors are interested in a proposed transaction, they should merely declare that interest to the board, and section 239 which stipulates that in approving any transaction the interested director may not vote.

Facts
Blaikie Bros had a contract with Aberdeen Railway to make iron chairs at £8.50 a ton. They sued to enforce the contract. Aberdeen Railway argued they were not bound because at the time, the Chairman of their board of directors, Sir Thomas Blaikie, was the Managing Director of Blaikie Bros. Therefore, there was a conflict of interest.

This case preceded ss 40-1 of the Companies Act 2006, which give directors unlimited capacity to bind the company with those dealing in good faith; but if an action by a director is beyond their authority or in breach of some fiduciary obligation, then they can be made personally liable. Arguably therefore, Blaikie Bros would now have been able to enforce the contract, but Aberdeen could then personally sue the directors for damages flowing from any loss.

Judgment
Lord Cranworth L.C. held that Aberdeen was not bound by the contract. The key points were that it "may sometimes happen that the terms on which a trustee has dealt or attempted to deal with the estate or interest of those for whom he is a trustee, have been as good as could have been obtained from any other person - they may even at the time have been better. But still so inflexible is the rule that no inquiry on that subject is permitted. The English authorities on this head are numerous and uniform." Mr Blaikie’s ‘personal interest would lead him to an entirely opposite direction, would induce him to fix the price as high as possible. This is the very evil against which the rule in question is directed, and here I see nothing whatever to prevent its application."
Lord Cranworth LC also stated that: "no one, having [fiduciary] duties to discharge, shall be allowed to enter into engagements in which he has, or can have, a personal interest conflicting, or which possibly may conflict, with the interests of those whom he is bound to protect".

See also
Boulting v ACTAT [1963] 2 QB 606, relevant to s 172 Companies Act 2006 
Companies Act 1985, Table A, Art 85, a default rule which changes the default rule of the case to say if a director discloses the nature and extent of the interest to the board, an interested transaction will not be voidable.
s 317 Companies Act 1985, that a director must declare his interests to the board. Failure to comply leads to a fine.
Cook v Deeks [1916] 1 AC 554
Regal (Hastings) Ltd v Gulliver [1942] 1 All ER 378
Industrial Development Consultants Ltd v Cooley [1972] 1 WLR 443 
Island Export Finance Ltd v Umunna [1986] BCLC 460
Framlington Group plc v Anderson [1995] BCC 611
Gencor ACP Ltd v Dalby [2000] 2 BCLC 734
CMS Dolphin Ltd v Simonet [2001] 2 BCLC 704

Notes

References
R Flannigan, 'The adulteration of fiduciary doctrine in corporate law' (2006) 122 LQR 449

United Kingdom company case law
House of Lords cases
1853 in case law
1853 in British law
Railway litigation in 1853